Irofulven or 6-hydroxymethylacylfulvene (also known as HMAF of MGI-114) is an experimental antitumor agent. It belongs to the family of drugs called alkylating agents.

It inhibits the replication of DNA in cell culture.

Irofulven is an analogue of illudin S, a sesquiterpene toxin found in the Jack 'o' Lantern mushroom (Omphalotus illudens). The compound was originally synthesized by Dr. Trevor McMorris and found to have anticancer properties in mice by Dr. Michael J Kelner.


Licensing and Clinical development

The drug was created and patented by the University of California, San Diego (UCSD), and subsequently licensed to the US biotech company MGI Pharma. Eisai acquired MGI in 2007, and the license was returned to UCSD, which then re-licensed the potential cancer drug to Lantern Pharma in 2015. Soon after, the drug was again sub-licensed to Oncology Venture.

The drug has undergone a number of clinical trials, mostly for late-stage tumors as well as ovarian and prostate cancers, usually preceded by treatment with carboplatin and paclitaxel. A multi-center phase 2 trial involving patients with Recurrent or Persistent Ovarian Epithelial or Primary Peritoneal Cancer was well tolerated but irofluven demonstrated modest activity as a single agent. Previously, a European Phase I study in combination with cisplatin showed substantial evidence for anti-tumor activity. In that study, irofulven showed rapid elimination and high interpatient variability. Platinum and irofulven pharmacokinetics did not suggest drug-drug interactions.

Despite modest successes demonstrating limited efficacy for late stage tumors that were statistically not significant enough to support broader clinical trials, Oncology Venture has decided to stratify patient populations with companion diagnostic tools (biomarkers) to predict outcomes, and thus select that sub-set of patients through DRP (Drug Response Predictors), for whom treatment with irofulven would be most effective. Oncology Venture Sweden AB has initiated two Phase 2 drug-screening studies at two Danish University Hospitals for late-stage prostate cancers, wherein 300 patients have been included to be screened, of which only 15 are to be selected for the Phase 2 trial.

Synthesis
A synthesis of irofulven has been reported.

References

Experimental cancer drugs
Cyclopropanes
Diols
Ketones
Spiro compounds
Terpenes and terpenoids